Rowanty Creek is a 14-mile long creek that is a tributary to the Nottoway River in southeastern Virginia.  It is formed at the confluence of Hatcher Run and Gravelly Run.

Course
Rowanty Creek flows southeast from its confluence source in a braided swamp.  Along the way, it encounters a few constrictions that narrow the floodplain.  A number of swamps are connected together near its mouth with the Nottoway River.

Sources
The confluence of Hatcher Run and Gravelly Run mark the source of Rowanty Creek.  Hatcher Run is about 7 km/4 miles in length and arises at an elevation of about 310 feet near Poole Siding, Virginia. Hatcher Run is impounded in two places, Jordon Lake and Speers Millpond.  Gravelly Run at 17.5 km/11 miles is the longer of the two sources.  It arises at an elevation of 280 feet and has one impoundment, Wilkinson Pond.

Geology
Rowanty Creek flows its entire distance through Coastal Plain alluvium.  However, the two runs that form the creek start in Petersburg Granite that is part of the Piedmont.

See also
List of rivers of Virginia

References

USGS Geographic Names Information Service
USGS Hydrologic Unit Map - State of Virginia (1974)

Rivers of Virginia
Tributaries of Albemarle Sound